Mount Kinangop (or Ilkinangop) is a mountain in the southern Aberdare Range about  north of Nairobi, Kenya.
It is within the Aberdare National Park.

A dormant volcano, Kinangop overlooks the Kinangop Plateau to the west and the Great Rift Valley beyond.
Kinangop is the second-highest mountain in the Aberdares after Mount Satima.
The lower levels of the mountain have extensive bamboo forests. Higher up it is covered by tussock grasses.
The main peak is a rocky outcrop surrounded by open moorlands.
Due to the height, temperatures are cool and may drop below freezing at night.

References

Sources

Kinangop